XHPHUA-FM is a radio station on 100.1 FM in Huajuapan de León, Oaxaca, known as Hits 100.1 FM.

History
XHPHUA was awarded in the IFT-4 radio auction of 2017. The station began testing in October 2018 and was formally inaugurated on December 20 of that year.

References

Radio stations in Oaxaca
Radio stations established in 2018
2018 establishments in Mexico